Minia University (also spelled Minia) was established in Minia, in 1976 by virtue of Republican Decree No. (93), separating it from Assiut University. The campus is north of Minia. Its emblem is Nefertiti Bust.

University logo
The image of Queen Nefertiti was chosen within an open book as a log for the university. The Nefertiti bust is also the slogan of Minya governorate due to its historical and ideological role that it played in the history of ancient Egypt. The head of Nefertiti was found in the Tel Amarna region, to the south of Minya Governorate.

Faculties
The university has 17 faculties:

 Faculty of Agriculture
 Faculty of Education
 Faculty of Science
 Faculty of Arts (off campus)
 Faculty of Fine Arts
 Faculty of Engineering (off campus)
 Faculty of Medicine
 Faculty of Physical Education
 Faculty of Dentistry (off campus)
 Faculty of Dar Al-Uloom (Islamic teachings)
 Faculty of Nursing
 Faculty of Tourism and Hotels
 Faculty of Al-Alsun (languages)
 Faculty of Pharmacy
 Faculty of Computer Science
 Faculty of Specific Education
 Faculty of Kindergarten

Activities
In 2018, the university, in conjunction with the Ministry of Higher Education and Scientific Research, spearheaded a week-long sports event for people with disabilities. It was the first of its kind in Egypt's history.

References

External links
 Minia University on Facebook

 
Educational institutions established in 1976
1976 establishments in Egypt
Universities in Egypt